Brilliant was launched in Sweden in 1804, probably under another name, and take in prize circa 1812. She became a British merchantman. In 1813 two French frigates captured her, but then abandoned her. She continued to trade widely until she became a coaster sailing between London and Newcastle. She foundered in December 1840.

Career
Brilliant first appeared in the supplementary pages in Lloyd's Register (LR) in 1812.

In December 1814 Lloyd's List reported that the frigate  had found Brilliant, Davenport, master, which had been sailing from Maranham to Liverpool, abandoned at sea with her masts and sails alongside.

They removed Brilliants crew and abandoned her at sea; Hyperion brought her into Plymouth. The French put all their prisoners on Duck and released her. She arrived at the Isle of Scilly on 4 January 1814.

After her ownership changed from Wooster to Aisbit, Brilliants homeport became Shields.

Fate
Brilliant was wrecked in December 1840. A report from Filey, dated 22 December 1840, stated that the stern of a vessel had been found with "Brilliant of Shields" painted on it. 
Her entry in LR for 1840 bore the annotation "wrecked".

Citations

1804 ships
Ships built in Sweden
Captured ships
Age of Sail merchant ships of England
Maritime incidents in December 1840
Missing ships
Ships lost with all hands